Malmö Teater or Malmö Theater, formally Kongl. Priwilegierade Theatern i Malmö ('Royal Theater of Malmö'), was theater in Malmö in Sweden, active between 1809 and 1938.  It was situated at the street Stora Nygatan with an entrance at the square Gustav Adolfs torg. It is known as the first permanent theater building in the city of Malmö.

The first confirmed performance by a professional theater company is confirmed to have taken place by a German theater company in 1691, and the city was often visited by travelling theater companies during the 18th-century.  They performed in temporary localities, and there was a need for a proper theater building.  The mayor Carl Magnus Nordlindh initiated the building of a theater; king Gustav IV Adolf of Sweden had resided temporarily in the city in 1806-07 and there was a need by the authorities to make the city more representative in line with the king's mention of the city as the kingdom's second capital.  The building was constructed in 1807-09, designed by Anders Sundström, and had room for 500 spectators.  Malmö Teater was inaugurated on 16 October 1809 by a theater company from Stockholm.  The theater had no permanent staff, but was regularly used by visiting theater companies. Jenny Lind performed in 1840, followed by August Bournonville and Sarah Bernhardt (1883). During the early 20th-century, the Albert Ranft's company regularly performed there. The building was torn down in 1938.

References
 Baeckström, Arvid, Teater i Malmö och Lund i början av 1800-talet, 1940

Former theatres in Sweden
History of Malmö
1809 establishments in Sweden
19th century in Malmö
Cultural history of Sweden
1938 disestablishments in Sweden
Demolished buildings and structures in Sweden
Buildings and structures demolished in 1938